The 1995 Buffalo Bulls football team represented the University at Buffalo in the 1995 NCAA Division I-AA football season. The Bulls offense scored 198 points while the defense allowed 259 points.

Schedule

References

Buffalo
Buffalo Bulls football seasons
Buffalo Bulls football